Carl Gustaf recoilless rifle can refer to:
Carl Gustaf 20 mm recoilless rifle
Carl Gustaf 84 mm recoilless rifle